The 2017–18 Monmouth Hawks men's basketball team represented Monmouth University during the 2017–18 NCAA Division I men's basketball season. The Hawks, led by seventh-year head coach King Rice, played their home games at OceanFirst Bank Center as members of the Metro Atlantic Athletic Conference. They finished the season 11–20 overall, 7–11 in MAAC play to finish in a tie for seventh place. As the No. 8 seed in the MAAC tournament, they were defeated in the first round by Saint Peter's.

Previous season 
The Hawks finished the season 27–7, 18–2 in MAAC play to win the regular season championship, their second consecutive conference title. As the No. 1 seed in the MAAC tournament, they defeated Niagara before losing to Siena in the semifinals. As a regular season conference champions who did not win their conference tournament, Monmouth received an automatic bid the National Invitation Tournament. As a No. 4 seed, they lost to Ole Miss in the first round.

Roster

Schedule and results

|-
! colspan="9" style=| Non-conference regular season

|-
! colspan="9" style=| MAAC regular season

|-
! colspan="9" style=| MAAC tournament

References

Monmouth Hawks men's basketball seasons
Monmouth